A Sub Above, LLC., doing business as Jersey Mike's Subs, is an American submarine sandwich chain headquartered in Manasquan, New Jersey. The Jersey Mike's franchise has about 2000 locations.  Outside of the United States, there are two locations in Ontario, Canada; (London and Kitchener) and one location in Guadalajara, Jalisco, Mexico.

History
In 1968 at age 14, Peter Cancro of Point Pleasant Beach, New Jersey, took a part-time job at Mike's Submarines, a neighborhood sandwich shop in the adjacent borough of Point Pleasant, at 1009 Trenton Avenue.  The eatery, founded in 1956, was only a few blocks west of Point Pleasant Beach High School, and then on its third owner.  When the shop went up for sale again in 1971, Cancro's mother suggested he buy it. With help from a high school football coach who was also a banker, Cancro, then 17 and a high school senior, pulled together $125,000 in three days. Today, Cancro is the owner and CEO of the company.

Cancro began franchising the restaurant in 1987. By 2014, it had 750 locations, with an additional 650 in some stage of development. In 2015, 197 new locations opened and the total number of Jersey Mike's locations exceeded 1,000. Jersey Mike's locations are gaining a larger presence on the West Coast, particularly Southern California.  The original Jersey Mike's location on Trenton Avenue is still used as a training center for the company.

Products
Like the original 1956 Mike's store, each Jersey Mike's Subs restaurant serves submarine sandwiches, which were made to order with slicing the meats and cheeses as needed. Each sandwich sub consisted of sliced onions, shredded lettuce, tomatoes, oregano, salt (spices) and a mixture of red wine vinegar and olive oil. There is also a signature cherry pepper relish.

Some Jersey Mike's locations also serve various breakfast sandwiches during the morning hours, including sandwiches made with pork roll, a New Jersey product.

See also
 List of submarine sandwich restaurants

References

External links
 

Submarine sandwich restaurants
Fast-food chains of the United States
Fast-food franchises
Companies based in Ocean County, New Jersey
American companies established in 1956
Restaurants established in 1956
1956 establishments in New Jersey
Fast casual restaurants
Fast-food restaurants
Restaurants in the United States